The spinular night frog (Nyctibatrachus acanthodermis)  is a species of frogs in the family Nyctibatrachidae that is only known from its type locality in the Palakkad District of Kerala, India. It is one of 12 species of frog in the genus Nyctibatrachus discovered in September 2011. It is found exclusively in the Western Ghats, India.

References

Nyctibatrachus
Endemic fauna of the Western Ghats
Frogs of India
Amphibians described in 2011
Taxa named by Sathyabhama Das Biju